Mecapaca Municipality is the second municipal section of the Pedro Domingo Murillo Province in the  La Paz Department, Bolivia. Its seat is Mecapaca.

See also 
 P'iq'iñ Q'ara

References 
 www.ine.gov.bo / census 2001: Mecapaca Municipality

Municipalities of La Paz Department (Bolivia)